Siah Chenar (also Romanized as Sīāh Chenār) is a village in Gahrbaran-e Jonubi Rural District, Gahrbaran District, Miandorud County, Mazandaran Province, Iran. At the 2006 census, its population was 231, in 68 families.

References 

Populated places in Miandorud County